Chthoniidae is a family of pseudoscorpions within the superfamily Chthonioidea.  The family contains more than 600 species in about 30 genera. Fossil species are known from Baltic, Dominican, and Burmese amber. Chthoniidae now includes the former families Tridenchthoniidae, and Lechytiidae which has been demoted to subfamilies.

Genera

For a list of all currently described species see List of Chthoniidae species.

 Aphrastochthonius J. C. Chamberlin, 1962 — Mexico, southern US, Guatemala, Cuba
 Apochthonius J. C. Chamberlin, 1929 — North America
 Austrochthonius J. C. Chamberlin, 1929 — South America, Australia, New Zealand
 Caribchthonius Muchmore, 1976 — Caribbean
 Chiliochthonius Vitali-di Castri, 1975 — Chile
 Chthonius C. L. Koch, 1843 — Europe to Iran, North Africa, Balearic Islands, USA; one cosmopolitan species
 Congochthonius Beier, 1959 — Zaire
 Drepanochthonius Beier, 1964 — Chile
 Francochthonius Vitali-di Castri, 1975 — Chile
 Kleptochthonius J. C. Chamberlin, 1949 — USA
 Lagynochthonius Beier, 1951 — Australasia, Africa
 Malcolmochthonius Benedict, 1978 — USA
 Maorichthonius J. C. Chamberlin, 1925 — New Zealand
 Mexichthonius Muchmore, 1975 — Mexico, Texas
 Mundochthonius J. C. Chamberlin, 1929 — Eurasia, Dominican Republic, North America
 Neochthonius J. C. Chamberlin, 1929 — California, Romania (?)
 Paraliochthonius Beier, 1956 — Europe, Africa, Florida, several islands
 Pseudochthonius Balzan, 1892 — South, Central America, Africa
 Sathrochthoniella Beier, 1967 — New Zealand
 Sathrochthonius J. C. Chamberlin, 1962 — Australia to New Caledonia, South America
 Spelyngochthonius Beier, 1955 — Sardinia, Spain, France
 Stygiochthonius Carabajal Marquez, Garcia Carrillo & Rodriguez Fernandez, 2001 — Spain
 Troglochthonius Beier, 1939 — Italy, Yugoslavia
 Tyrannochthoniella Beier, 1966 — New Zealand
 Tyrannochthonius J. C. Chamberlin, 1929 — Brazil to southern USA, Australasia, Africa, Hawaii
 Vulcanochthonius Muchmore, 2000 — Hawai'i
 †Weygoldtiella Harvey et al., 2018 — Burmese amber, Myanmar Cenomanian
†Prionochthonius — Burmese amber, Myanmar Cenomanian

Tridenchthoniinae 

 Anaulacodithella —  Southern Africa, Australia, New Caledonia
 † Chelignathus
 Compsaditha —  Africa, South America, South and Southeast Asia, Seychelles
 Cryptoditha —  South America
 Ditha —  Africa, Southeast Asia, Oceania
 Dithella —  Southeast Asia
 Haploditha — South America
 Heterolophus —  Australia, South America
 Neoditha — South America
 Pycnodithella — Africa, Australia
 Sororoditha — South America
 Tridenchthonius — Africa, South and Central America
 Typhloditha  — Africa
 Verrucaditha — North America
 Verrucadithella — Africa, South America

Lechytiinae 

 Lechytia Balzan, 1892 Worldwide

References

 Joel Hallan's Biology Catalog: Chthoniidae

 
Pseudoscorpion families